Roger Mayweather (April 24, 1961 – March 17, 2020) was an American boxing trainer and former professional boxer who competed from 1981 to 1999. He was a two-division world champion, having held the WBA and The Ring super featherweight titles from 1983 to 1984, and the WBC light welterweight title from 1987 to 1989. Additionally he held the IBO light welterweight title in 1994, and the IBO welterweight title from 1994 to 1995.

Mayweather was born in Grand Rapids, Michigan, the son of Bernice (Ambrose) and Theartha Mayweather. He was a part of the Mayweather boxing family: his brothers are Floyd Mayweather Sr. and Jeff Mayweather, and his nephew is Floyd Mayweather Jr. Roger served as Mayweather Jr.'s trainer from 2000 to 2012. Under Roger's guidance Floyd Mayweather Jr. became one of the biggest names in the sport of boxing and one of the pound for pound greats.

Professional boxing career

Super featherweight and lightweight
Mayweather, who was 64–4 as an amateur, made his professional debut on July 29, 1981, against Andrew Ruiz. Mayweather won by technical knockout (TKO) in the first round. In his thirteenth fight, Mayweather beat Ruben Muñoz Jr. for the IBF-USBA lightweight title.

After improving his record to 14–0, Mayweather earned a title shot on January 19, 1983, against lineal and WBA super featherweight champion, Samuel Serrano. Serrano entered the bout with a record of 49–3–1 and had lost only once since first winning the title in 1976. Nonetheless, Mayweather led on all three judges' scorecards before he beat Serrano by TKO in round eight and effectively ended Serrano's career.

Mayweather made two successful title defenses against Jorge Alvarado and Benedicto Villablanca before suffering his first loss via first-round knockout against Rocky Lockridge on February 22, 1984.

Mayweather won the IBF-USBA super featherweight title when he gave Kenny Baysmore his first loss, by TKO in round three. Thus, Mayweather earned the opportunity to fight against WBC super featherweight champion, Julio César Chávez, on July 7, 1985. Although Mayweather won the first round on the judges' scorecards, he was knocked down twice in round two and lost by TKO.

On November 28, 1986, Mayweather beat Sammy Fuentes for the WBC Continental Americas lightweight title. In his next bout, on March 28, 1987, Mayweather fought against Pernell Whitaker for the WBC-NABF lightweight title. Mayweather was knocked down in round one, but he knocked down Whitaker in round nine. Whitaker won by unanimous decision (UD).

Light welterweight
After Mayweather moved up to the light welterweight division, he fought against WBC light welterweight champion, Rene Arredondo, on November 12, 1987. Mayweather led on the scorecards and knocked down Arredondo three times in round six to win by TKO.

Mayweather made four successful title defenses before he encountered Mexican champion Julio César Chávez again on May 13, 1989.  Prior to this fight, Mayweather was being called by several boxing writers as "The Mexican assassin" due to his numerous wins over Mexican fighters during the last few years. Chávez was still undefeated at the time, and with a 63–0 record, he was becoming a legend. Mayweather retired after round ten due to the body damage inflicted by Chávez.

Mayweather won the WBA Americas light welterweight title on April 5, 1990, from Ildemar Paisan. He fought Rafael Pineda for the vacant IBF light welterweight title on December 7, 1991, but he lost by KO in round nine.

On March 14, 1993, Mayweather beat former WBA lightweight champion, Livingstone Bramble by corner stoppage in round five. Bramble had defeated Ray 'Boom Boom' Mancini twice for the title in the mid-1980s.

Mayweather defeated Eduardo Montes for the IBO light welterweight title by third-round KO on May 28, 1994. Less than three weeks later, he defeated Marco Antonio Ramirez by TKO in round three.

Welterweight
In his next fight, against Johnny Bizzarro on August 4, 1994, Mayweather won the IBO welterweight title by unanimous decision. He defended the belt once in 1995.

On June 25, 1995, Mayweather fought the 14–0 Kostya Tszyu for the IBF light welterweight title. Tszyu won by unanimous decision.

Mayweather won his last title—the IBA welterweight title—on March 12, 1997, when he beat Carlos Miranda via twelfth-round TKO. Mayweather's final bout was a majority decision victory over Javier Francisco Mendez on May 8, 1999. He ended his career with a total of nine major and minor titles in four weight classes.

Black Mamba 
When asked about his ring nickname, Roger stated:

"It's funny because I wanted a boxing nickname that wouldn’t be common to most people. One day when I was  flipping through channels and I came upon this channel showing different reptiles, and they were showing the black mamba, one of the most deadly snakes in the world. I loved the way the mamba attacked so quietly, but when he hit you he just hit you one time and the poison was in you. That reminded me of myself right there."

Training career 
When Floyd Mayweather Jr. turned pro in 1996, Roger Mayweather turned his attention away from his own competitive boxing career and focused more on being the younger Mayweather's trainer. Roger trained Floyd Jr. until early 1998, when Floyd Mayweather Sr. was released from prison and became Mayweather Jr's  trainer. However, soon after Mayweather defeated Gregorio Vargas on March 18, 2000, Mayweather Jr. fired Mayweather Sr. as his trainer and brought uncle Roger back.

Roger Mayweather garnered national attention during and after Floyd Mayweather Jr. vs. Zab Judah on April 8, 2006. Near the conclusion of the tenth round, Judah hit Mayweather with a left hand that was clearly below the belt and followed up with a right-handed rabbit punch. After referee Richard Steele called time with five seconds remaining in the round, Roger Mayweather entered the ring, but was restrained by Steele. Judah's father and trainer, Yoel Judah, entered the ring and swung at Roger. Zab then went after Roger—taking a swing and grappling with him until security broke it up and cleared the ring. Roger was ejected, but the boxers finished the remaining two rounds, and Mayweather won by unanimous decision. Five days after the fight, the Nevada State Athletic Commission decided not to overturn the result of the bout, but Roger Mayweather was fined US $200,000 and suspended for one year.

Controversy
Mayweather was arrested in August 2009 in Las Vegas for allegedly attacking one of his former boxers, female boxer Melissa St. Vil.  Mayweather allegedly hit her several times in the ribs, then tried to choke her, causing her to spit up blood when police arrived. Appearing on the HBO series 24/7, Mayweather admitted to choking St. Vil in an effort to restrain her, but denied that he physically struck her.

Death
Mayweather died on March 17, 2020, in Las Vegas, Nevada at age 58, after years of deteriorating health. Floyd opened up about Roger's health back in 2015, and thinks that boxing is the main cause of it.

He did not specify the cause, but said his uncle's “health was failing him for several years.” Roger Mayweather had a number of long-term health problems, including diabetes.

"My uncle Roger Mayweather has lost a lot of memory from the sport of boxing, he's only in his 50s, but it seems like he's an old man in his 80s." Floyd said.

Professional boxing record

See also
List of world super-featherweight boxing champions
List of world light-welterweight boxing champions
List of boxing families

References

External links

Roger Mayweather's letter to the NSAC
Roger Mayweather Roger Mayweather profile at Cyber Boxing Zone

|-

|-

1961 births
2020 deaths
American boxing trainers
American male boxers
African-American boxers
Boxers from Michigan
Sportspeople from Grand Rapids, Michigan
Lightweight boxers
Welterweight boxers
World Boxing Association champions
World Boxing Council champions
International Boxing Organization champions
The Ring (magazine) champions
World super-featherweight boxing champions
World light-welterweight boxing champions
20th-century African-American sportspeople
21st-century African-American people